Anton Vasilyev may refer to:
Anton Vasilev, (born 1983), Russian canoe racer
Anton Aleksandrovich Vasilyev, (born 1983), Russian footballer